A stunt cock is the term for a substitute (sometimes prosthetic) penis that is used during the shooting of pornographic films.

The stunt cock is used in an extreme close up so as not to identify its bearer, the goal being to deceive the viewer into thinking that the stunt cock is the penis of the main actor. Thus, a stunt cock is analogous to a "stunt man", who anonymously does dangerous live-action sequences in place of the main actor. However, a stunt cock seldom performs dangerous acts on film. Though the term draws its name from this term, its practical application is more analogous to a body double.

Industry role
Stunt cock work is a very common "workhorse" position in the pornography industry. 

Work on a pornographic film can be very demanding, and it is often difficult for actors to perform on demand as needed. A common function of a stunt cock is to stand in for an actor who is unable to achieve erection or ejaculation on an actor who has a penis of a similar size and appearance, so that filming can continue on schedule.

In popular culture
 In the 1976 film The First Nudie Musical, the character Rosie (played by Cindy Williams of Laverne & Shirley fame) announces the arrival of a "stunt cock" to complete the filming of a key porn scene. 
 In the 1997 Trey Parker film Orgazmo, the protagonist's director assigns him a stunt cock, as he does not want to participate in the sexual scenes due to his Mormon affiliation. 
 In the sixth book of The Dresden Files, Blood Rites, Harry investigates a pornographic film crew and is mistaken for a stunt cock by one of the actors.
 A stunt cock is used in the TV show Californication to complete the filming of Vagina Town when the lead actor has "coke dick".

Example of non-pornographic films where stunt cocks have been used
 Antichrist, directed by Lars von Trier.

References

Pornography terminology
Sex workers
Human penis